A fascia (plural fasciae  or fascias; adjective fascial; from Latin: "band") is a band or sheet of connective tissue, primarily collagen, beneath the skin that attaches to, stabilizes, encloses, and separates muscles and other internal organs. Fascia is classified by layer, as superficial fascia, deep fascia, and visceral or parietal fascia, or by its function and anatomical location.

Like ligaments, aponeuroses, and tendons, fascia is made up of fibrous connective tissue containing closely packed bundles of collagen fibers oriented in a wavy pattern parallel to the direction of pull. Fascia is consequently flexible and able to resist great unidirectional tension forces until the wavy pattern of fibers has been straightened out by the pulling force.  These collagen fibers are produced by fibroblasts located within the fascia.

Fasciae are similar to ligaments and tendons as they have collagen as their major component. They differ in their location and function: ligaments join one bone to another bone, tendons join muscle to bone, and fasciae surround muscles and other structures.

Structure
There exists some controversy about what structures are considered "fascia", and how types of fascia should be classified. The two most common systems are:
 The one specified in the 1983 edition of Nomina Anatomica (NA 1983)
 The one specified in the 1997 edition of Terminologia Anatomica (TA 1997)

Superficial fascia
Superficial fascia is the lowermost layer of the skin in nearly all of the regions of the body, that blends with the reticular dermis layer. It is present on the face, over the upper portion of the sternocleidomastoid, at the nape of the neck, and overlying the breastbone. It consists mainly of loose areolar, and fatty adipose connective tissue and is the layer that primarily determines the shape of a body. In addition to its subcutaneous presence, superficial fascia surrounds organs and glands, neurovascular bundles, and is found at many other locations where it fills otherwise unoccupied space. It serves as a storage medium of fat and water; as a passageway for lymph, nerve and blood vessels; and as a protective padding to cushion and insulate.

Superficial fascia is present, but does not contain fat, in the eyelid, ear, scrotum, penis and clitoris.

Due to its viscoelastic properties, superficial fascia can stretch to accommodate the deposition of adipose that accompanies both ordinary and prenatal weight gain. After pregnancy and weight loss, the superficial fascia slowly reverts to its original level of tension.

Visceral fascia
Visceral fascia (also called subserous fascia) suspends the organs within their cavities and wraps them in layers of connective tissue membranes.  Each of the organs is covered in a double layer of fascia; these layers are separated by a thin serous membrane.
 The outermost wall of the organ is known as the parietal layer
 The skin of the organ is known as the visceral layer. The organs have specialized names for their visceral fasciae.  In the brain, they are known as meninges; in the heart they are known as pericardia; in the lungs, they are known as pleurae; and in the abdomen, they are known as peritonea.

Visceral fascia is less extensible than superficial fascia.  Due to its suspensory role of the organs, it needs to maintain its tone rather consistently. If it is too lax, it contributes to organ prolapse, yet if it is hypertonic, it restricts proper organ motility.

Deep fascia

Deep fascia is a layer of dense fibrous connective tissue which surrounds individual muscles, and also divides groups of muscles into fascial compartments.
This fascia has a high density of elastin fibre that determines its extensibility or resilience. Deep fascia was originally considered to be essentially avascular but later investigations have confirmed a rich presence of thin blood vessels. Deep fascia is also richly supplied with sensory receptors. Examples of deep fascia are fascia lata, fascia cruris, brachial fascia, plantar fascia, thoracolumbar fascia and Buck's fascia.

Function
Fasciae were traditionally thought of as passive structures that transmit mechanical tension generated by muscular activities or external forces throughout the body. An important function of muscle fasciae is to reduce friction of muscular force.  In doing so, fasciae provide a supportive and movable wrapping for nerves and blood vessels as they pass through and between muscles.
Fascial tissues are frequently innervated by sensory nerve endings. These include myelinated as well as unmyelinated nerves. Based on this a proprioceptive, nociceptive as well as interoceptive function of fascia has been postulated.
Fascial tissues – particularly those with tendinous or aponeurotic properties – are also able to store and release elastic potential energy.

Clinical significance
Fascia becomes important clinically when it loses stiffness, becomes too stiff, or has decreased shearing ability. When inflammatory fasciitis or trauma causes fibrosis and adhesions, fascial tissue fails to differentiate the adjacent structures effectively. This can happen after surgery, where the fascia has been incised and healing includes a scar that traverses the surrounding structures.

Anatomical compartments

A fascial compartment is a section within the body that contains muscles and nerves and is surrounded by fascia. In the human body, the limbs can each be divided into two segments: The upper limb can be divided into the arm and the forearm and the sectional compartments of both of these – the fascial compartments of the arm and the fascial compartments of the forearm contain an anterior and a posterior compartment. The lower limbs can be divided into two segments – the leg and the thigh – and these contain the fascial compartments of the leg and the fascial compartments of the thigh.

A fasciotomy may be used to relieve compartment syndrome as a result of high pressure within a fascial compartment.

See also

 Clavipectoral fascia
 Endothoracic fascia
 Extracellular matrix
 Interstitial cell
 Pectoral fascia
 Thoracolumbar fascia
 Fascia (architecture)

References

External links

 Fascia Research
 

 
Connective tissue